Demons and Wizards is the fourth studio album by British rock band Uriah Heep, released 19 May 1972 by Bronze Records in the UK and Mercury Records in the US.

Composition and recording
New Zealander Gary Thain, at the time a member of Keef Hartley Band, joined Uriah Heep as a permanent member halfway through another American tour. "Gary just had a style about him, it was incredible because every bass player in the world that I've ever known has always loved his style, with those melodic bass lines," lead guitarist Mick Box commented later. Another addition, of drummer Lee Kerslake (a former bandmate of Ken Hensley's in the Gods and Toe Fat), solidified the rhythm section. Thus the "classic" Uriah Heep lineup was formed, and according to biographer Kirk Blows, "everything just clicked into place". While the album title and Roger Dean's cover art both suggested medieval fantasy, Hensley's notes declared the album to be "just a collection of our songs that we had a good time recording".

Hensley recalled: "The band was really focused at that time. We all wanted the same thing, were all willing to make the same sacrifices to achieve it and we were all very committed. It was the first album to feature that lineup and there was a magic in that combination of people that created so much energy and enthusiasm".

Cover art
The original vinyl release was a gatefold sleeve, the front of which was designed by Roger Dean. The inner sleeve had pictures of the band and notes by Hensley, while the liner featured printed lyrics.

Release
The album reached No. 20 in the UK and No. 23 in the US. In Finland, the album hit No. 1 in May and remained on top of the charts for 14 weeks.

The songs "The Wizard" and "Easy Livin'" were released as singles in the UK and North America as well as many other markets. The latter, a defiant rocker, according to Blows, was "tailor-made for Byron's extrovert showmanship" and entered the US Billboard Hot 100 chart reaching No. 39, making it Heep's first and only American Top 40 hit. "Easy Livin'" was also a mega-hit in the Netherlands and Germany, countries which were becoming strong markets for the band. It reached a disappointing No. 75 in Australia.

Demons and Wizards was remastered and reissued by Castle Communications in 1996 with three bonus tracks, and again in 2003 in an expanded deluxe edition. In 2017, Sanctuary Records released a two-disc deluxe edition.

Reception

Rolling Stone, which printed an infamously negative review of the band's debut album, ran a positive assessment of Demons and Wizards. Mike Saunders wrote: "These guys are good. The first side of Demons and Wizards is simply odds-on the finest high energy workout of the year, tying nose and nose with the Blue Öyster Cult...they may have started out as a thoroughly dispensable neo-Cream & Blooze outfit, but at this point Uriah Heep are shaping up into one hell of a first-rate modern rock band". According to AllMusic, the album "solidified Uriah Heep's reputation as a master of gothic-inflected heavy metal". Martin Popoff in his Collector's Guide to Heavy Metal described the album as "a sullen, solitary, contemplative sort of record, existing in a hazy flux on the more mystical side of early heavy metal" and praised the new rhythm section and especially Byron's performance, which demonstrated his "capable helmsmanship of both the most subtle of contemplative bits and the loudest of rock roars."

The album also served as partial inspiration for Hansi Kürsch and Jon Schaffer's side project Demons and Wizards.

In an interview Lee Kerslake did with Brave Words & Bloody Knuckles from 2020, when asked "Is it true that Randy Rhoads was a big fan of the Demons and Wizards album?", he replied, "Yes, he was. He loved the way the style of the music, the way it turned and the way it went. And that's why when he came up with the idea of a riff – me, Bob, and Randy – we wrote ‘Diary of a Madman.’ It was such a strong song on the album".

Track listings

Personnel
Uriah Heep
 David Byron – lead vocals
 Mick Box – guitars
 Ken Hensley – keyboards, guitars, percussion, backing vocals, co-lead vocals on "Paradise" and "The Spell"
 Lee Kerslake – drums, percussion
 Gary Thain – bass guitar

Additional musician
 Mark Clarke – bass guitar on "The Wizard" and "Why", co-lead vocals on "The Wizard"

Production
Gerry Bron – producer
Peter Gallen – engineer
Ashley Howe – assistant engineer

Charts

Certifications

References

External links
 The Official Uriah Heep Discography

1972 albums
Uriah Heep (band) albums
Albums with cover art by Roger Dean (artist)
Albums produced by Gerry Bron
Bronze Records albums
Mercury Records albums